Spyros Chatzikyriakos (born 12 October 2004) is a Greek professional footballer who plays as a centre-back for Super League 2 club AEK Athens B.

References

2004 births
Living people
Greek footballers
Greece youth international footballers
Super League Greece 2 players
Fostiras F.C. players
Association football defenders
Footballers from Athens